PREESM (the Parallel and Real-time Embedded Executives Scheduling Method) is an open-source rapid prototyping and code generation tool. It is primarily employed to simulate signal processing applications and generate code for multi-core Digital Signal Processors. PREESM is developed at the Institute of Electronics and Telecommunications-Rennes (IETR) in collaboration with Texas Instruments France in Nice.

The PREESM tool inputs are an algorithm graph, an architecture graph, and a scenario which is a set of parameters and constraints that specify the conditions under which the deployment will run. The chosen type of algorithm graph is a hierarchical extension of Synchronous Dataflow (SDF) graphs named Interface-Based hierarchical Synchronous Dataflow (IBSDF). The architecture graph is named System-Level Architecture Model (S-LAM). From these inputs, PREESM maps and schedules automatically the code over the multiple processing elements and generates multi-core code.

Documentation 
Online documentation is provided in the PREESM Website.

Publications 
 
 
 
 
 
 
 
 
 

Free software programmed in Java (programming language)